De Veranda is a neighborhood within South Holland, in the Netherlands., Rotterdam, Netherlands. It is a relatively new development compared to the older surrounding Neighborhoods, such as Oud-Ijsselmonde.

Neighbourhoods of Rotterdam